Guitar Man is the fifth album by Bread, released in 1972.

The album produced three U.S. Top 20 singles: "The Guitar Man" (#11), "Sweet Surrender" (#15), and "Aubrey" (#15).

Guitar Man peaked at No. 18 on the Billboard 200.

Critical reception
Billboard called the album a "dynamite program," writing that "Aubrey" "is superb." The New Rolling Stone Record Guide deemed it a "classic" album, writing that "it's pop, but transcendent pop." The Birmingham Post wrote that the highlights "are, not surprisingly, the Gates' compositions, 'Sweet Surrender', 'Aubrey' and the title track, three of the strongest songs he ever contributed to the band."

Track listing

Side One
"Welcome to the Music" – 2:57 (Gates)
"The Guitar Man" – 3:46 (Gates)
"Make It by Yourself" – 3:50 (Gates, Griffin)
"Aubrey" – 3:39 (Gates)
"Fancy Dancer" – 3:33 (Botts, Griffin)
"Sweet Surrender" – 2:38 (Gates)

Side Two
"Tecolote" – 4:35 (Gates)
"Let Me Go" – 3:27 (Griffin, Royer)
"Yours For Life" – 3:21 (Gates)
"Picture in Your Mind" – 4:42 (Knechtel)
"Don't Tell Me No" – 3:34 (Griffin, Royer)
"Didn't Even Know Her Name" – 3:09 (Gates, Griffin)

Personnel
David Gates - vocals, guitars, bass, keyboards, violin, Moog
Jimmy Griffin - vocals, guitars, piano
Larry Knechtel - piano, bass, organ, harmonica, guitars, miscellaneous keyboards
Mike Botts - drums, percussion

References

Bread (band) albums
1972 albums
Elektra Records albums
Albums produced by David Gates
Albums produced by Jimmy Griffin